The  Palmital River is a river of Santa Catarina state in south-eastern Brazil.

See also
List of rivers of Santa Catarina

References
 Map from Ministry of Transport

Rivers of Santa Catarina (state)